is a Japanese voice actor.  He is represented by the agency Arts Vision.

Filmography

TV Animation

Anime Films

Original net animation 
 Monster Strike (2015), John Manjiro
 Japan Sinks: 2020 (2020), Osamu Asada

Original video animation (OVA) 
 Yarichin Bitch Club (2018), Yū Kashima

Dubbing

TV drama 
 Avataro Sentai Donbrothers: Donblaster (Voice)

References

External links 
  Official Agency Profile 
 

Living people
1989 births
People from Tokyo
Male voice actors from Tokyo